Cosmism may refer to:

 A religious philosophical position from the writings of Hugo de Garis
 Russian cosmism, a philosophical and cultural movement in Russia in the early 20th century

See also
 Cosmicism, a literary philosophy by H. P. Lovecraft 
 Acosmism